This is a list of Italian television related events from 2008.

Events
10 March - Launch of the Italian version of The X Factor.
21 April - Mario Ferretti wins the eighth season of Grande Fratello.
27 May - Aram Quartet win the first season of X Factor.

Debuts
10 March - X Factor (2008–present)

Television shows

Rai

Drama 

 Coco Chanel – biopic by Christian Duguay, with Barbora Bobulova and Shirley McLaine in the title role, respectively as a young woman and an aged one; 2 episodes. Coproduced with France and United States.

Serials 

 PsicoVip – by Bruno Bozzetto, cartoon in 3D animation, spin-off of the movie VIP my brother Superman.

2000s
Grande Fratello (2000–present)
Ballando con le stelle (2005–present)

Ending this year

Births

Deaths

See also
List of Italian films of 2008

References